Ervin Szörenyi was a Hungarian sprint canoer who competed in the mid-1950s. He won a silver medal in the K-1 4 x 500 m event at the 1954 ICF Canoe Sprint World Championships in Mâcon.

References

Hungarian male canoeists
Possibly living people
Year of birth missing
ICF Canoe Sprint World Championships medalists in kayak
20th-century Hungarian people